Grubela is a settlement in the Khetagurovo Community, Tskhinvali district of South Ossetia.

Geography 
Located on Shida Kartli plain.   900  meters above sea level.

See also
 Tskhinvali District

Notes

References  

Populated places in Tskhinvali District